This is a list of notable events in music that took place in the year 1943.

Specific locations
1943 in British music
1943 in Norwegian music

Specific genres
1943 in country music
1943 in jazz

Events
January 1 – Frank Sinatra appears at the Paramount Theatre causing a mob of hysterical bobby-soxers to flood Times Square and blocking midtown New York City traffic for hours.
Sinatra becomes a featured singer on the popular Your Hit Parade radio program, and the co-star of the series Broadway Bandbox. By fall, he has left Bandbox to star in his own series Songs By Sinatra.
January 23 – Duke Ellington's orchestra performs for the first time at New York's Carnegie Hall. During the concert, which raises money for war relief, Ellington premieres his most famous and revered extended composition, Black, Brown and Beige.
June 17 – Perry Como signs with RCA.
 September 27 – Decca Records is the first label to come to terms with the American Federation of Musicians, which had been on strike since August 1942 over music royalties. The first song recorded was "Pistol Packin' Mama" by Bing Crosby and the Andrews Sisters.
 October 30 – "Pistol Packin' Mama" by Al Dexter goes where no "Hillbilly" record has ever gone, to the top of the National Best Selling Retail Records chart. Despite fighting a World War in Europe and the Pacific, civilian and armed forces alike are caught up in a national craze not seen again until Elvis and the Beatles. But not everyone was excited about Country music; Dexter's publishing company sued "The Hit Parade" radio show for ignoring their record.
November 14 – Leonard Bernstein, substituting at the last minute for ailing principal conductor Bruno Walter, directs the New York Philharmonic in its regular Sunday afternoon broadcast concert on CBS. The event receives front-page coverage in The New York Times the following day.
Jo Stafford and The Pied Pipers sign with the newly formed Capitol Records (having broken from the Tommy Dorsey band in 1942).
Fredda Gibson takes her professional name, "Georgia Gibbs", and begins appearing on the popular Camel Caravan radio program, hosted by Jimmy Durante and Gary Moore (It is Moore who bestows the famous nickname "Her Nibs, Miss Georgia Gibbs" upon her, a playful reference to her diminutive stature of barely over 5 feet).
The Ward Singers first tour nationally in the United States.
Carter Family disbands.
William Schuman's cantata A Free Song wins the first Pulitzer Prize for Music.

Albums released
Oklahoma – Original Broadway Cast, 1,000,000 sales
Reveille with Beverly – Original soundtrack

Top popular recordings 1943

1941 was a great year for the United States recording industry, as bad memories of the Depression-tainted 1930s were replaced by record-setting sales. Then came Pearl Harbor, and on August 1, 1942, a strike by the American Federation of Musicians, which ended all recording sessions. Record companies kept business going by releasing promising recordings from their vaults, but by mid-1943, alternate sources were running dry, as the strike continued. Decca was the first company to settle with the union in September, but year-end statistics showed a 50% drop in charted records from 1942. 

For each Year in Music (beginning 1940) and Year in Country Music (beginning 1939), a comprehensive Year End Top Records section can be found at mid-page (popular), and on the Country page. These charts are meant to replace the charts Billboard prints at the end of each year, because they are better. Keep reading.

The charts are compiled from data published by Billboard magazine, using their formulas, with slight modifications. Most important, there are no songs missing or truncated by Billboard's holiday deadline. Each year, records included enter the charts between the prior November and early December. Each week, fifteen points are awarded to the number one record, then nine points for number two, eight points for number three, and so on. This system rewards songs that reach the highest positions, as well as those that had the longest chart runs. This is our adjustment to Mr. Whitburn's formula, which places no. 1 records on top, then no 2 and so on, ordered by weeks at that position. This allows a record with 4 weeks at no. 1 that only lasted 6 weeks to be rated very high. Here, the total points of a song's complete chart run determines its position. Our chart has more songs, more weeks and may look nothing like Billboard's, but it comes from the exact same surveys. 

Before the Hot100 was implemented in 1958, Billboard magazine measured a record's performance with three charts, 'Best-Selling Popular Retail Records', 'Records Most-Played On the Air' or 'Records Most Played By Disk Jockeys' and 'Most-Played Juke Box Records'. As Billboard did starting in the 1940s, the three totals for each song are  combined, with that number determining the final year-end rank. For example, 1944's "A Hot Time in the Town of Berlin" by Bing and the Andrews Sisters finished at no. 19, despite six weeks at no. 1 on the 'Most-Played Juke Box Records'(JB) chart. It scored 126 points, to go with its Best-Selling chart (BS) total of 0. Martha Tilton's version of "I'll Walk Alone" peaked at no. 4 on the Juke Box chart, which only totalled 65 points, but her BS total was also 65, for a final total of 130, ranking no. 18. Examples like this can be found in "The Billboard" magazine up to 1958. By the way, the 'Records Most-Played On the Air' chart didn't begin until January 1945, which is why we only had two sub-totals.

Our rankings are based on Billboard data, but we also present info on recording and release dates, global sales totals, RIAA and BPI certifications and other awards. Rankings from other genres like 'Hot R&B/Hip-Hop Songs' or 'Most Played Juke Box Race Records', Country charts including 'Most Played Juke Box Folk (Hillbilly) Records', 'Cashbox magazine', and other sources are presented if they exist. We supplement our info with reliable data from the "Discography of American Historical Recordings" website, Joel Whitburn's Pop Memories 1890-1954 and other sources as specified.

The following songs appeared in The Billboard's 'Best Selling Retail Records' chart during 1943.

Harlem Hit Parade Top Records of 1943

Published popular music
 "All Er Nuthin'" words: Oscar Hammerstein II music: Richard Rodgers
 "Amor" w. (Eng) Sunny Skylar (Sp) Ricardo Lopez Mendez m. Gabriel Ruiz
 "Artistry In Rhythm" m. Stan Kenton
 "Beat Out Dat Rhythm On a Drum" w. Oscar Hammerstein II m. Georges Bizet
 "Besame Mucho" w. Sunny Skylar m. Conseulo Velázquez
 "By the River of the Roses" w. Marty Symes m. Joe Burke
 "Candlelight and Wine" w. Harold Adamson m. Jimmy McHugh. Introduced by Georgia Carroll and Harry Babbitt in the film Around the World
 "Close to You" w.m. Al Hoffman, Jerry Livingston & Carl Lampl
 "Comin' In on a Wing and a Prayer" w. Harold Adamson m. Jimmy McHugh
 "Deacon Jones" w.m. Johnny Lange, Hy Heath & Richard Loring
 "Do Nothin' Till You Hear from Me" w. Bob Russell m. Duke Ellington
 "Don't Let's Be Beastly To The Germans" w.m. Noël Coward
 "Don't Sweetheart Me" w. Charles Tobias m. Cliff Friend
 "The Farmer and the Cowman" w. Oscar Hammerstein II m. Richard Rodgers from the musical Oklahoma!
 "A Fellow on a Furlough" w.m. Bobby Worth
 "Foolish Heart" w. Ogden Nash m. Kurt Weill. Introduced by Mary Martin in the musical One Touch Of Venus
 "Goodbye, Sue" w.m. Jimmy Rule, Lou Ricca & Jules Loman
 "Have I Stayed Away Too Long?" w.m. Frank Loesser
 "Hit the Road to Dreamland" w. Johnny Mercer m. Harold Arlen
"How Much I Love You" w. Ogden Nash m. Kurt Weill. Introduced by Kenny Baker in the musical One Touch Of Venus
 "I Cain't Say No" w. Oscar Hammerstein II m. Richard Rodgers
 "I Couldn't Sleep A Wink Last Night" w. Harold Adamson m. Jimmy McHugh
 "I Love You" w. Robert Wright & George Forrest m. Grieg
 "I Sustain the Wings" m. Glenn Miller, Chummy MacGregor, Norman Leyden & Bill Meyers
 "If You Please" w. Johnny Burke m. Jimmy Van Heusen
 "I'll Be Home For Christmas" w.m. Kim Gannon, Walter Kent & Buck Ram
"I'm a Stranger Here Myself" w. Ogden Nash m. Kurt Weill. Introduced by Mary Martin in the musical One Touch Of Venus
 "I'm Going to Get Lit Up When the Lights Go On In London" w.m. Hubert Gregg
 "I'm Riding for a Fall" w. Frank Loesser m. Arthur Schwartz. Introduced by Dennis Morgan and Joan Leslie in the film Thank Your Lucky Stars
 "It Could Happen to You" w. Johnny Burke m. Jimmy Van Heusen
 "It's a Scandal! It's a Outrage!" w. Oscar Hammerstein II m. Richard Rodgers. From the musical Oklahoma!
 "Johnny Zero" w. Mack David m. Vee Lawnhurst
 "A Journey to a Star" w. Leo Robin m. Harry Warren. Introduced by Alice Faye in the film The Gang's All Here
 "Kansas City" w. Oscar Hammerstein II m. Richard Rodgers
 "Little Ships Will Sail Again" w.m. Jack O'Hagan
 "A Lovely Way to Spend an Evening" w. Harold Adamson m. Jimmy McHugh
 "Mairzy Doats" w.m. Milton Drake, Al Hoffman & Jerry Livingston
 "Many a New Day" w. Oscar Hammerstein II m. Richard Rodgers
 "La Mer" w.m. Charles Trenet
 "Moonlight in Vermont" w. John Blackburn m. Karl Suessdorf
 "My Heart Tells Me" w. Mack Gordon m. Harry Warren
 "My Shining Hour" w. Johnny Mercer m. Harold Arlen
 "No Love, No Nothin' " w. Leo Robin m. Harry Warren. Introduced by Alice Faye in the film The Gang's All Here
 "Oh, What a Beautiful Mornin'"' w. Oscar Hammerstein II m. Richard Rodgers
 "Oklahoma!" w. Oscar Hammerstein II m. Richard Rodgers
 "One for My Baby (and One More for the Road)" w. Johnny Mercer m. Harold Arlen
 "Opus No. 1" w. Sid Garris m. Sy Oliver
 "Out of My Dreams" w. Oscar Hammerstein II m. Richard Rodgers
 "Pedro the Fisherman" w. Harold Purcell m. Harry Parr-Davies
 "People Will Say We're In Love" w. Oscar Hammerstein II m. Richard Rodgers
 "Pore Jud is Daid" w. Oscar Hammerstein II m. Richard Rodgers
 "Rosie the Riveter" w.m. Redd Evans & John Jacob Loeb
 "San Fernando Valley" w.m. Gordon Jenkins
 "Say a Prayer for the Boys Over There" w. Herb Magidson m. Jimmy McHugh. Introduced by Deanna Durbin in the film Hers to Hold
 "Shoo Shoo Baby" w.m. Phil Moore
 "Silver Wings In The Moonlight" w.m. Hughie Charles, Sonny Miller & Leo Towers
 "So Tired" w.m. Russ Morgan & Jack Stuart
 "Speak Low" w. Ogden Nash m. Kurt Weill. w. Ogden Nash m. Kurt Weill. Introduced by Mary Martin and Kenny Baker in the musical One Touch Of Venus. Performed in the 1948 film version by Dick Haymes, and Eileen Wilson dubbing for Ava Gardner.
 "Star Eyes" w.m. Don Raye & Gene De Paul
 "Straighten Up and Fly Right" w.m. Nat King Cole & Irving Mills
 "Sunday, Monday Or Always" w. Johnny Burke m. Jimmy Van Heusen
 "Take It Easy" w.m. Albert De Brue, Irving Tayor & Vic Mizzy. Introduced in the 1944 musical film Two Girls and a Sailor by Virginia O'Brien, Lee Wilde, Lyn Wilde, and Lina Romay with Xavier Cugat and His Orchestra
 "The Surrey with the Fringe on Top" w. Oscar Hammerstein II m. Richard Rodgers
 "That's Him" w. Ogden Nash m. Kurt Weill w. Ogden Nash m. Kurt Weill. Introduced by Mary Martin in the musical One Touch of Venus. Performed in the 1948 film version by Eileen Wilson (dubbing for Ava Gardner), Olga San Juan and Eve Arden.
 "They're Either Too Young or Too Old" w. Frank Loesser m. Arthur Schwartz
 "Tico-Tico" w. (Eng) Ervin Drake (Port) Aloysio Oliviera m. Zequinha Abreu
 "To Keep My Love Alive" w. Lorenz Hart m. Richard Rodgers
 "Two Very Ordinary People" Carr, Taylor
 "Vict'ry Polka" w. Sammy Cahn m. Jule Styne
 "What Do You Do In the Infantry?" w.m. Frank Loesser
 "When Can I Have a Banana Again?" Mills, Rogers, Ray
 "You'll Never Know" w. Mack Gordon m. Harry Warren introduced by Alice Faye in the film Hello, Frisco, Hello and also performed by Faye in the 1944 film Four Jills in a Jeep

Classical music

Premieres

Compositions

 Henk Badings – Symphony No. 4
 Béla Bartók – Concerto for Orchestra
 Leonard Bernstein – I Hate Music
 Benjamin Britten
 Rejoice in the Lamb, festival cantata
 Serenade for Tenor, Horn and Strings
Alberto Ginastera – Five Argentinian Folk Songs
 Reinhold Glière – 25 let Krasnoj Armii (25 Years of the Red Army), Ouverture for wind-orchestra op. 84
 Morton Gould – Viola Concerto
 Howard Hanson – Symphony No. 4
 Paul Hindemith
Symphonic Metamorphosis of Themes by Carl Maria von Weber for orchestra
Ludus Tonalis, for piano
 Joaquim Homs – Choral Mass
 Paul von Klenau – String Quartet No. 3
 Rued Langgaard – Concerto in one movement for violin and orchestra
 Bohuslav Martinů
Symphony No. 2
In Memory of Lidice
Concerto for Two Pianos
Violin Concerto No. 2
 Nikolai Medtner – Piano Concerto No. 3
 Douglas Moore – In memoriam
 Saburō Moroi – Sinfonietta for Children
 Vítězslav Novák – May Symphony, for soli, chorus and orchestra
 Carl Orff – Catulli Carmina (revised version)
 Walter Piston – Symphony No. 2
 Manuel Ponce – Violin Concerto
 Sergei Prokofiev – Flute Sonata in D Major
 Joaquín Rodrigo – Heroic Concerto
 William Schuman – Symphony No. 5, for strings
 Dmitri Shostakovich
 Piano Sonata No. 2
 Symphony No. 8
 Randall Thompson – The Testament of Freedom
 Eduard Tubin – Suite on Estonian Dances for Violin and Piano
 Ralph Vaughan Williams
 The Story of a Flemish Farm
 Symphony No. 5 in D Major
 William Walton
 The Quest (ballet)
 Violin Concerto
 Alberto Williams – Poema del Iguazú

Opera
Hans Krása – Brundibár, children's opera, first performed by inmates of Terezin transit camp

Film
Bernard Herrmann – Jane Eyre (1943 film)
Erich Korngold – The Constant Nymph (1943 film)
Alfred Newman – The Song of Bernadette
Miklós Rózsa – Five Graves to Cairo
Miklós Rózsa – Sahara
Ralph Vaughan Williams – Coastal Command
Ralph Vaughan Williams – [The Flemish Farm

Jazz

Musical theatre
Bright Lights of 1944 Broadway production opened at the Forrest Theatre on September 16 and ran for 4 performances
 Carmen Jones Broadway production opened at the Broadway Theatre on December 2 and ran for 502 performances
 Early to Bed Broadway production opened at the Broadhurst Theatre on June 17 and ran for 380 performances
 The Lisbon Story London production opened at the Hippodrome Theatre on June 17 and ran for 492 performances
 Oklahoma! (Richard Rodgers and Oscar Hammerstein II) – Broadway production opened at the St. James Theatre on March 31 and ran for 2411 performances
 One Touch Of Venus Broadway production opened at the Imperial Theatre on October 7 and ran for 567 performances
 Show Boat (Jerome Kern and Oscar Hammerstein II) – London revival opened at the Stoll Theatre on April 17 and ran for 264 performances
 Sweet And Low London revue opened at the Ambassadors Theatre on June 10 and ran for 264 performances

Musical films
 Beautiful Michoacán (Spanish:¡Qué lindo es Michoacán!), starring Tito Guízar, Gloria Marín and Víctor Manuel Mendoza.
 Best Foot Forward, starring Lucille Ball and Nancy Walker and featuring Harry James & his Music Makers
 Cabin In The Sky, starring Ethel Waters, Eddie Anderson, Lena Horne and Louis Armstrong
Coney Island, starring Betty Grable, George Montgomery, Cesar Romero and Phil Silvers
 Crazy House, starring Ole Olsen, Chic Johnson and Cass Daley
 DuBarry Was a Lady, released August 13 starring Red Skelton, Lucille Ball, Gene Kelly, Virginia O'Brien, Tommy Dorsey & his Orchestra and the Pied Pipers.
 The Gang's All Here, starring Alice Faye, Carmen Miranda and Edward Everett Horton and featuring Benny Goodman & his Orchestra
 Girl Crazy, starring Mickey Rooney, Judy Garland and June Allyson
 Happy Go Lucky, starring Mary Martin, Dick Powell, Betty Hutton and Rudy Vallee
 Hers to Hold, released July 16, starring Deanna Durbin and Joseph Cotten.
 Higher and Higher, featuring Frank Sinatra and Victor Borge
 Hit Parade of 1943, starring John Carroll, Susan Hayward, Gail Patrick and Eve Arden and featuring Dorothy Dandridge, Count Basie & his Orchestra, Freddy Martin & his Orchestra and Ray McKinley & his Orchestra
 I Dood It, starring Eleanor Powell and Red Skelton and featuring Helen O'Connell & Bob Eberly with Jimmy Dorsey and his Orchestra, and Hazel Scott.
 Let's Face It, starring Bob Hope, Betty Hutton, Zasu Pitts and Eve Arden
 Mister Big, starring Donald O'Connor, Gloria Jean, Peggy Ryan and Robert Paige and featuring Ray Eberle
 Reveille with Beverly, starring Ann Miller and featuring Frank Sinatra, Ella Mae Morse, The Mills Brothers, Freddie Slack & his Orchestra, Bob Crosby & his Orchestra and Duke Ellington & his Orchestra
 Riding High, starring Dorothy Lamour and Dick Powell
 Something to Shout About, released February 25, starring Don Ameche, Janet Blair, Jack Oakie and Cyd Charisse, and featuring Hazel Scott.
 Stormy Weather, released July 21, starring Lena Horne, Cab Calloway and "Bojangles" Bill Robinson.
 Swing Fever, starring Kay Kyser & his Orchestra, Marilyn Maxwell and Lena Horne; directed by Tim Whelan.
 Thousands Cheer, starring Kathryn Grayson, Gene Kelly, Mary Astor and John Boles and featuring Mickey Rooney, Judy Garland and Eleanor Powell.
 We'll Meet Again, released January 18, starring Vera Lynn, Geraldo and Patricia Roc.

Births

January–March
January 2 – Barış Manço, singer-songwriter (died 1999)
January 7 – Richard Armstrong, orchestral conductor
January 9 – Scott Walker, singer and composer (died 2019)
January 10
Jim Croce, singer-songwriter (died 1973)
Alan Lloyd, composer (died 1986)
January 14
Mariss Jansons, conductor (died 2019)
 José Luis Rodríguez, singer
January 16
Gavin Bryars, composer and double bassist
Brian Ferneyhough, English composer
Ronnie Milsap, country musician
January 17 – Chris Montez, singer
January 18 – Dave Greenslade, composer and rock keyboard player (Colosseum, Greenslade, If)
January 19 – Janis Joplin, blues singer (died 1970)
January 26 – Thom Bell, Philadelphia soul songwriter and producer (died 2022)
January 29 – Tony Blackburn, British radio DJ and singer
January 30 – Marty Balin, American rock musician (Jefferson Airplane) (died 2018)
February 3
Neil Bogart, American record producer, founder of Casablanca Records (died 1982)
Dennis Edwards, American soul and R&B singer (The Temptations) (died 2018)
Eric Haydock, English pop/rock guitarist (The Hollies) (died 2019)
Shawn Phillips, American folk-rock musician
February 5 – Chuck Winfield (Blood, Sweat & Tears)
February 6 – Fabian Forte, teen idol singer
February 8 – Creed Bratton (The Grass Roots)
February 9 – Barbara Lewis, singer and songwriter
February 14
Eric Andersen, singer-songwriter
Maceo Parker, saxophonist
February 15 – Lal Waterson, folk singer-songwriter (died 1998)
February 19 – Lou Christie, singer
February 21 – David Geffen, record executive
February 23 – Moshe Cotel, American composer and pianist (died 2008)
February 25 – George Harrison, guitarist, singer and songwriter (The Beatles) (died 2001)
February 26 – Paul Cotton, rock guitarist and singer-songwriter (Poco)
February 27 – Morten Lauridsen, composer
February 28 – Donnie Iris, American musician (The Jaggerz, Wild Cherry, Donnie Iris and the Cruisers)
March 2 – George Benson, soul guitarist
March 7 – Chris White, rock guitarist, singer-songwriter and record producer (The Zombies)
March 9 – David Matthews, composer
March 14
Leroy "Sugarfoot" Bonner, American funk singer, guitarist and producer (Ohio Players) (died 2013)
Jim Pons, American rock guitarist and singer (The Turtles, The Mothers of Invention)
March 15 – Sly Stone, musician, singer-songwriter and record producer
March 18 – Dennis Linde, songwriter (died 2006)
March 21 – Vivian Stanshall, English singer-songwriter (The Bonzo Dog Doo-Dah Band) (died 1995)
March 22 – Keith Relf, British rock musician (The Yardbirds) (died 1976)
March 25 – Royston Maldoom OBE, British choreographer
March 29
Eric Idle, English actor, writer and songwriter
Vangelis, Greek-born musician and composer (died 2022)

April–June
April 2
Larry Coryell, jazz fusion guitarist (died 2017)
Glen Dale, harmony beat vocalist (The Fortunes)
April 3
Richard Manuel, Canadian pianist and singer (The Band) (died 1986)
Joey Vann, doo-wop singer (The Duprees)
April 7 – Mick Abrahams, guitarist (Jethro Tull)
April 8 – Alfred "Uganda" Roberts, percussionist (died 2020)
April 9 – Terry Knight, music producer, singer and songwriter (died 2004)
April 11 – Tony Victor, vocalist (The Classics)
April 20 – Sir John Eliot Gardiner, conductor
April 26 – Gary Wright, singer-songwriter and keyboardist (Spooky Tooth)
April 28
Jacques Dutronc, singer and composer
Sir Jeffrey Tate, conductor (died 2017)
April 30 – Bobby Vee, singer (died 2016)
May 4 – Sundar Popo, Indo-Trinidadian chutney musician (died 2000)
May 7
Terry Allen, American country music singer
Rick West, beat lead guitarist (The Tremeloes)
May 8 – Paul Samwell-Smith, blues rock bass guitarist and producer (The Yardbirds, Renaissance)
May 9 – Bruce Milner, sunshine pop keyboardist (Every Mother's Son)
May 11
Les Chadwick, beat bass guitarist (Gerry and the Pacemakers) (died 2019)
Arnie Satin, vocalist (The Dovells)
May 13 – Mary Wells, singer (died 1992)
May 14
Jack Bruce, Scottish bass guitarist (Cream) (died 2014)
Derek Leckenby, English rock guitarist (Herman's Hermits) (died 1994)
May 21
Vincent Crane, English keyboardist (Atomic Rooster, The Crazy World of Arthur Brown)
Hilton Valentine, English guitarist (The Animals) (died 2021)
May 23 – Alan Walden, American businessman and manager, co-founder of Capricorn Records
May 25 – Leslie Uggams, American singer
May 26 – Levon Helm, American drummer and singer (The Band) (died 2012)
May 27 – Cilla Black, singer and entertainer (died 2015)
May 28 – Tony Mansfield (Tony Bookbinder), pop drummer (The Dakotas)
June 2 – Jimmy Castor, disco/funk saxophonist (died 2012)
June 3 – Mike Dennis, vocalist (The Dovells)
June 14 – Muff Winwood (Spencer Davis Group)
June 15 – Johnny Hallyday, pop singer and actor (died 2017)
June 17 – Barry Manilow, American singer, pianist, arranger and songwriter
June 23 – James Levine, conductor and pianist (died 2021)
June 26 – Georgie Fame, R & B musician
June 27 – Tony Calder, English record promoter (died 2018)
June 28 – Bobby Harrison, English drummer (Procol Harum) (died 2022)
June 29 – Little Eva, pop singer (died 2003)
June 30 – Florence Ballard, Motown R&B vocalist (The Supremes) (died 1976)

July–September
July 1 – Jeff Wayne, American musician
July 2 – Larry Lake, American-Canadian trumpet player and composer (died 2013)
July 3 – Judith Durham, singer (The Seekers) (died 2022)
July 4
Conny Bauer, jazz trombonist
Alan Wilson, blues musician (Canned Heat) (died 1970)
July 12 – Christine McVie, pop rock singer-songwriter and keyboardist (Fleetwood Mac) (died 2022)
July 18
Robin MacDonald, pop guitarist (The Dakotas) (died 2015)
Bobby Sherman, singer, actor and songwriter
July 25 – Jim McCarty, drummer and vocalist (The Yardbirds, Renaissance)
July 26 – Mick Jagger, rock singer and actor (The Rolling Stones)
July 27 – Allan Ramsey, rock bass guitarist (Gary Lewis & the Playboys) (died 1985)
July 28
Mike Bloomfield, American guitarist/singer-songwriter and composer (The Electric Flag) (died 1981)
Richard Wright, English keyboardist and singer (Pink Floyd) (died 2008)
August 2
Patrick Adiarte, American actor and dancer
Kathy Lennon, American singer (The Lennon Sisters)
August 4 – David Carr, keyboardist (The Fortunes)
August 10 – Ronnie Spector, singer (died 2022)
August 11 – Denis Payton, saxophonist (The Dave Clark Five) (died 2006)
August 19
Edwin Hawkins, American urban contemporary gospel musician (died 2018)
Billy J. Kramer, born William H. Ashton, English pop singer
August 23 – Pino Presti, Italian musician and record producer
August 24 – John Cipollina, American rock guitarist (Quicksilver Messenger Service) (died 1989)
August 25 – Peter Bastian, Danish bassoonist (died 2017)
August 26 – Dori Caymmi, Brazilian singer/songwriter
August 28
Honey Lantree, drummer (The Honeycombs) (died 2018)
David Soul, singer and actor
August 29 – Dick Halligan, rock musician (Blood, Sweat & Tears)
September 2
Rosalind Ashford, R&B singer (Martha and the Vandellas)
Joe Simon, soul singer (died 2021)
September 5 – Joe "Speedo" Frazier, doo-wop singer (The Impalas) (died 2014)
September 6 – Roger Waters, English bass guitarist, singer and songwriter (Pink Floyd)
September 11- Mickey Hart, American rock drummer (Grateful Dead)
September 12 – Maria Muldaur, singer
September 16 – Joe Butler, rock singer (The Lovin' Spoonful)
September 20 – Ted Neeley, actor and singer (Jesus Christ Superstar (film))
September 23
Steve Boone, rock singer (The Lovin' Spoonful)
Julio Iglesias, singer
September 25
Gary Alexander, pop musician (The Association)
John Locke, rock musician (Spirit)
September 26 – Georgie Fame, R&B singer
September 27 – Randy Bachman Canadian guitarist, singer and songwriter (The Guess Who, Bachman–Turner Overdrive)
September 28 – Nick St. Nicholas, German-born rock musician (Steppenwolf)
September 30 – Marilyn McCoo, singer (The 5th Dimension)

October–December
October 1 – Jerry Martini (Sly & The Family Stone)
October 5 – Steve Miller (Steve Miller Band)
October 7 – Dino Valenti (Quicksilver Messenger Service)
October 10 – Denis D'Ell (The Honeycombs)
October 16 – Fred Turner, bassist (Bachman–Turner Overdrive)
October 21 – Ron Elliott (The Beau Brummels)
October 23 – Barbara Ann Hawkins (The Dixie Cups)
October 24 – Dafydd Iwan, folk singer-songwriter and politician
November 3 – Bert Jansch, folk musician (Pentangle) (died 2011)
November 4 – Sundar Popo, Indo-Trinidadian chutney musician (died 2000)
November 7 – Joni Mitchell, singer-songwriter
November 12
Brian Hyland, singer
Jimmy Hayes, The Persuasions
November 12 – John Maus, vocalist (The Walker Brothers)
November 16 – Winifred Lovett (The Manhattans)
November 28 – Randy Newman, singer-songwriter
November 30
Leo Lyons (Ten Years After)
Rob Grill (The Grass Roots) (died 2011)
December 6 – Mike Smith, singer-songwriter (The Dave Clark Five) (died 2008)
December 8 – Jim Morrison, singer (The Doors) (died 1971)
December 9 – Rick Danko (The Band) (died 1999)
December 12
Dickey Betts (The Allman Brothers Band)
Dave Munden (The Tremeloes)
Grover Washington, Jr., jazz-funk saxophonist (died 1999)
December 16 – Tony Hicks, guitarist (The Hollies)
December 18
Keith Richards, guitarist and songwriter (The Rolling Stones)
Bobby Keys, saxophonist (died 2014)
December 23 – Harry Shearer, actor, musician (This Is Spinal Tap)
December 27 – Peter Sinfield, British lyricist and producer
December 28 – Chas Hodges, British rockney singer (Chas & Dave) (died 2018)
December 30 – Rolf Gehlhaar, American composer
December 31
John Denver, singer-songwriter (died 1997)
Peter Quaife, bassist (The Kinks) (died 2010)

Deaths
January 17 – Jane Avril, can-can dancer, 64
February 7
Clara Novello Davies, singer, mother of Ivor Novello, 81
Sigrid Arnoldson, operatic soprano, 82
February 17 – Armand J. Piron, jazz violinist, bandleader and composer, 54
March 7 – Alma Moodie, violinist, 44 (drug overdose)
March 8 – Alice Nielsen, Broadway performer and operatic soprano, 70
March 19 – Abel Decaux, composer, 74
March 28
Ben Davies, operatic tenor, 85
Sergei Rachmaninoff, composer, 69
April 4 – David Roitman, hazzan and composer, 58
April 12 – Edoardo Garbin, operatic tenor, 78
April 29 – Joseph Achron, violinist and composer, 56
April 30 – René Blum, founder of the Ballet de l'Opera at Monte Carlo, 65 (in Auschwitz concentration camp)
May 26 – Alice Tegnér, organist and composer, 77
May 28 – Vaughn De Leath, US singer and radio pioneer, 48 (alcohol-related)
June 16 – Sigrid Onégin, opera singer, 54
June 26 – Ruby Elzy, African American soprano Porgy and Bess, 35 (post-operative complications)
July 13 – Lorenzo Barcelata, songwriter, 44
July 20 – Maria Gay, opera singer, 64
September 1 – August Brunetti-Pisano, Austrian composer, 72
September 7
Frank Crumit, US singer, 53
Karlrobert Kreiten, pianist, 27
September 21 – Trixie Smith, blues singer, 48
October 5 – Leon Roppolo, jazz musician, 41
October 23 – Ben Bernie, US jazz violinist and bandleader, 52
October 31 – Max Reinhardt, theatre director, 70
November 22 – Lorenz Hart, lyricist, 48 (pneumonia)
November 26 – Winnaretta Singer, musical patron, 78
November 28 – Arthur Catterall, violinist, orchestra leader and conductor, 60
December 15 – Fats Waller, jazz pianist and singer, 39 (pneumonia)
December 18 – Joseph McCarthy, composer, 58
date unknown
Max Bouvet, operatic baritone (born 1854)
Harry Kandel, bandleader (born 1885)
Erhard Wechselmann, baritone opera singer (born 1895?) (killed in Auschwitz concentration camp)

References

External links
 

 
20th century in music
Music by year